Fox Sports College Hoops '99 is a college basketball sports video game developed by Z-Axis and published by Fox Interactive under the brand name Fox Sports Interactive and distributed by 20th Century Fox Home Entertainment for the Nintendo 64. Jeff Sheppard of the University of Kentucky is featured on the cover.

The game features 120 college basketball teams, multiplayer support for two players, and many of the college championships including the NCAA men's basketball championship. It was the first college sports game for the Nintendo 64.

Gameplay

The game allows the player to play a single game between any two teams in an exhibition mode, or to play a season mode as the manager of a college basketball team. College Hoops '99 only supports up to two player multiplayer, unlike comparable games of the time which supported four player multiplayer. The season mode contains most of the major college tournaments including early-season tournaments, although the National Invitation Tournament was not included.

The game uses Fox Sports's TV set-up in order to give the player a more realistic feel to gameplay. However, there is no commentary and there are no fight songs or other university-specific songs in the game.

Reception

Fox Sports College Hoops '99 received mixed reviews according to the review aggregation website GameRankings. GamePro felt that the game had extremely intelligent artificial intelligence and praised the game overall. IGNs Peer Schneider criticized the arcade-style slowdown that happened during shooting. GameSpots Nelson Taruc called the game an "incomplete work in progress".

Notes

References

External links
 

1998 video games
College basketball video games in the United States
North America-exclusive video games
Nintendo 64 games
Nintendo 64-only games
Fox Interactive games
NCAA video games
Video games developed in the United States